N'Sigha (also written Nessirha or En Nessirha ) is a village in the commune of El M'Ghair, in El M'Ghair District, El M'Ghair Province, Algeria.

References

Neighbouring towns and cities

Populated places in El Oued Province